Waldburg-Friedburg-Scheer was a County ruled by the House of Waldburg, located in southeastern Baden-Württemberg, Germany. Waldburg-Friedburg-Scheer was a partition of Waldburg-Trauchburg, to which it was restored in 1717.

1612 establishments in the Holy Roman Empire